Der Kanon ("The Canon") or more precisely Marcel-Reich-Ranickis Kanon is a large anthology of exemplary works of German literature. Edited by the literary critic Marcel Reich-Ranicki (1920–2013), he called the anthology, announced on 18 June 2001 in the German news magazine Der Spiegel under the title "The Canon of worthwhile German Works", his magnum opus. The five parts appeared from 2002 to 2006 published by Insel Verlag: 1. Novels (2002), 2. Tales/Stories (2003), 3. Dramatic Works (2004), 4. Poetry (2005), and 5. Essays (2006). As expected, the anthology met with opposition and criticism, and even the idea of an anthology was questioned, but Reich-Ranicki called this questioning "incomprehensible, because the lack of a canon would mean relapse into barbarism. Reich-Ranicki sought to differentiate his anthology from previous compilations in his hope to imagine a "reader judge" such as teachers, students, librarians, who would need to draw from this canon because they were in the "first line of those who deal with literature professionally."

The edited anthology takes the series title, Der Kanon. Die deutsche Literatur (The Canon of German Literature) in book form with slip cases.

 Der Kanon. Die deutsche Literatur. Romane. 20 Volumes (2002), 
 Der Kanon. Die deutsche Literatur. Erzählungen. 10 Volumes and 1 Companion Volume (2003), 
 Der Kanon. Die deutsche Literatur. Dramen. 8 Volumes and 1 Companion Volume (2004), 
 Der Kanon. Die deutsche Literatur. Gedichte. 7 Volumes and 1 Companion Volume (2005), 
 Der Kanon. Die deutsche Literatur. Essays. 5 Volumes und 1 Companion Volume (2006),

Main contents

Early works
 The Nibelungenlied
 Walter von der Vogelweide: Poems
 Martin Luther, trans.: The Bible (excerpts)
 Andreas Gryphius: Poems
 Christian Hofmann von Hofmannswaldau: Poems

18th century
 Johann Christian Günther: Poems
 Gotthold Ephraim Lessing: Minna von Barnhelm; Hamburg Dramaturgy (excerpts); Nathan der Weise
 Johann Wolfgang von Goethe: Die Leiden des jungen Werthers; Faust I; Aus meinem Leben: Dichtung und Wahrheit (excerpts); Poems
 Friedrich Schiller: Kabale und Liebe "or" Maria Stuart; Die Schaubühne als eine moralische Anstalt Betrachtet (The Theatre considered as a Moral Institution) (excerpts), Don Carlos; On Naive and Sentimental Poetry, Wallenstein, Ballads.

19th century

 Johann Peter Hebel: Schatzkästlein des rheinischen Hausfreundes (selections)
 Friedrich Hölderlin: Hyperion oder der Eremit in Griechenland (excerpts); Poems
 Novalis: Poems
 Friedrich von Schlegel: Essays
 E. T. A. Hoffmann: Die Serapionsbrüder (excerpts)
 Heinrich von Kleist: The Marquise of O, Michael Kohlhaas; The Prince of Homburg; Short Stories (selected)
 Clemens Brentano: Poems
 Adelbert von Chamisso: Peter Schlemihls wundersame Geschichte
 Joseph Freiherr von Eichendorff: Poems
 Ferdinand Raimund: Der Verschwender
 August Graf von Platen: Poems
 Annette von Droste-Hülshoff: Die Judenbuche; Poems
 Heinrich Heine: Poems; Prose (selected)
 Eduard Mörike: Poems
 Georg Büchner: Dantons Tod; Woyzeck; Lenz
 Theodor Storm: Short Stories (selected)
 Gottfried Keller: Short Stories (selected)
 Theodor Fontane: Schach von Wuthenow; Frau Jenny Treibel or Der Stechlin; Effi Briest
 Friedrich Nietzsche: Essays

20th century
 Arthur Schnitzler: La Ronde; Leutnant Gustl; Professor Bernhardi
 Gerhart Hauptmann: Die Ratten
 Frank Wedekind: Frühlings Erwachen
 Stefan George: Poems
 Else Lasker-Schüler: Poems
 Heinrich Mann: Professor Unrat
 Christian Morgenstern: Gedichte
 Hugo von Hofmannsthal: Der Schwierige
 Karl Kraus: Essays
 Thomas Mann: Buddenbrooks; Tonio Kröger; Tristan; Der Tod in Venedig; Mario und der Zauberer; Essays
 Rainer Maria Rilke: Poems
 Hermann Hesse: Unterm Rad
 Carl Sternheim: Der Snob
 Robert Walser: Jakob von Gunten; Erzählungen
 Alfred Döblin: Die Ermordung einer Butterblume; Berlin Alexanderplatz
 Robert Musil: Die Verwirrungen des Zöglings Törleß; Tonka
 Franz Kafka: Der Process; Die Verwandlung; Ein Bericht für eine Akademie; In der Strafkolonie; Ein Hungerkünstler
 Gottfried Benn: Poems
 Georg Heym: Poems
 Georg Trakl: Poems
 Kurt Tucholsky: Feuilletons
 Joseph Roth: Radetzkymarsch; Die Legende vom heiligen Trinker; Stationschef Fallmerayer; Short Stories
 Bertolt Brecht: Mutter Courage und ihre Kinder; Leben des Galilei; Kalendergeschichten (selections); Poems
 Erich Kästner: Gedichte
 Anna Seghers: Das siebte Kreuz; Der Ausflug der toten Mädchen
 Ödön von Horváth: Kasimir und Karoline
 Peter Huchel: Poems
 Wolfgang Koeppen: Tauben im Gras
 Günter Eich: Poems
 Max Frisch: Diary (excerpts);  Homo faber; Biedermann und die Brandstifter; Montauk
 Arno Schmidt: Die Umsiedler; Seelandschaft mit Pocahontas
 Peter Weiss: Marat/Sade
 Heinrich Böll: Der Mann mit den Messern; Wanderer, kommst du nach Spa...; Doktor Murkes gesammeltes Schweigen
 Paul Celan: Poems
 Friedrich Dürrenmatt: Die Panne
 Ernst Jandl: Poems
 Ingeborg Bachmann: Poems
 Günter Grass: Die Blechtrommel (auszugsweise); Cat and Mouse
 Peter Rühmkorf: Poems
 Hans Magnus Enzensberger: Poems
 Thomas Bernhard: Holzfällen; Wittgensteins Neffe – Eine Freundschaft
 Uwe Johnson: Mutmassungen über Jakob (excerpts)
 Sarah Kirsch: Poems
 Wolf Biermann: Poems
 Jurek Becker: Jacob the Liar
 Robert Gernhardt: Poems

Novels

Stories
180 Novellas, short Stories, Parables, Fairy Tales, Legends, and Kalendergeschichte.

Essays

The series of "essays" gave Reich-Ranicki much "grief." Even the choice of the title "essays" was hotly debated. Reich-Ranicki included not just essays in a classic sense, but also a wide variety of critical works including criticism of film, literature, music reviews, theater reviews, essays, speeches, diaries, letters, ephemera, and aphorisms, spanning both fictional and nonfictional literature. The term "essayistic" was coined for this purpose.

The "essay" canon contains 255 articles from 166 authors covering a wide variety of subject matter. It is divided into five parts:
 from Martin Luther to Arthur Schopenhauer
 from Leopold von Ranke to Rosa Luxemburg
 from Heinrich Mann to Joseph Roth
 from Bertold Brecht to Golo Mann
 from Max Frisch to Durs Grünbein

Adaptations

In 2015, the author Hannes Bajohr published his "novel" Durchschnitt (Average) based on Reich-Ranicki's novel canon. For his book, he analyzed the texts of the twenty volume novel-box of the series, calculated their average sentence length (18 words), and, with the help of a computer script, generated a book that only contained these average sentences. He then sorted them alphabetically in chapters according to the letters of the alphabet.

References

German literature
Anthologies